Robinsonville is an unincorporated community in Restigouche County, New Brunswick, Canada on Route 17.

History
Robinsonville was named after its first postmaster Alexander Robertson, officially appointed in 1885.  Presumably, the spelling changed over time from Robertsonville, to the more easily pronounced Robinsonville.

Notable people

See also
List of communities in New Brunswick

References

Communities in Restigouche County, New Brunswick